Michel Issindou (born 12 July 1952) was a member of the National Assembly of France.  He represented the Isère's 2nd constituency from 2007 to 2017, as a member of the Socialiste, radical, citoyen et divers gauche.

References

1952 births
Living people
Deputies of the 13th National Assembly of the French Fifth Republic
Deputies of the 14th National Assembly of the French Fifth Republic